Parliamentary elections were held in Bolivia in May 1914 to elect half the seats of the Chamber Deputies and one-third of the Senate.

Results

Elected members
The new senators were: 
Arturo Molina Campero, PL (Tarija)
Andrés S. Muñoz, PL (La Paz)
Manuel E. Aramayo, PL (Potosí)
José Antezana, PL Potosí
Julio A. Gutiérrez, PL (Santa Cruz)

References

Elections in Bolivia
Bolivia
Legislative election
May 1914 events
Election and referendum articles with incomplete results